Malka Soda is a district in the Borena Zone of Oromia Region in Ethiopia.

References 

Districts of Oromia Region